Mirsad Jonuz (born 9 April 1962) is a former Macedonian football goalkeeper and head coach.

Playing career

Club
Born in Sveti Nikole, SR Macedonia, SFR Yugoslavia, as a player Jonuz was member of numerous Yugoslav clubs. He made his senior debut in 1985 with FK Teteks, playing then in the Yugoslav Second League. After that season he played with FK Bregalnica Shtip and FK Borec before joining Belgrade side FK Rad where he made his debut in the Yugoslav First League in the 1988–89 season. During the winter break he moved to FK Novi Pazar and played the rest of the season in the Second League, before returning to the top flight in the next season by signing with FK Vardar. In the summer of 1990 he joined Second League side FK Sutjeska Nikšić. He had another spell with FK Rad until 1993 when he moved abroad to Greece and joined Levadiakos playing in the Greek Championship.

Managerial career
On 1996 he began his coaching career in FK Rabotnichki and the club played in the UEFA Cup. In 2001, he took charge of FK Pobeda and made a record with 15 wins. The club also played in the Intertoto Cup, and the next year they played in UEFA Cup. In 2002, he worked at FK Rabotnichki Kometal again. From 2003 to 2009 he was a head coach of the Macedonian U-21 national team. He was also the coach of the Macedonia B team in 2005.

On 16 May 2009, Jonuz was appointed as a head coach of the Macedonian national team, replacing Slovenian Srečko Katanec. He was a head coach until June 2011.

From 2012 to 2013 he was also a coach in FC Nea Salamina, Cyprus. From 2014 to 2015 he was a technical director of FC Horizont Turnovo. From 2018 to 2019 he was a head coach of FC Aiginiakos Greece.

He has a coaching UEFA PRO license.

References

External links
 Stats from Yugoslav League at Zerodic.
 Mirsad Jonuz at zerozero.pt

1962 births
Living people
People from Sveti Nikole Municipality
Association football goalkeepers
Macedonian footballers
FK Teteks players
FK Bregalnica Štip players
FK Borec players
FK Rad players
FK Novi Pazar players
FK Vardar players
FK Sutjeska Nikšić players
Levadiakos F.C. players
Yugoslav First League players
Yugoslav Second League players
First League of Serbia and Montenegro players
Super League Greece players
Macedonian expatriate footballers
Expatriate footballers in Serbia and Montenegro
Macedonian expatriate sportspeople in Serbia and Montenegro
Expatriate footballers in Greece
Macedonian expatriate sportspeople in Greece
Macedonian football managers
FK Rabotnički managers
FK Pobeda managers
North Macedonia national under-21 football team managers
North Macedonia national football team managers
Nea Salamis Famagusta FC managers
KF Vllaznia Shkodër managers
Macedonian expatriate football managers
Expatriate football managers in Cyprus
Macedonian expatriate sportspeople in Cyprus
Expatriate football managers in Albania
Macedonian expatriate sportspeople in Albania